Lucius Calpurnius Piso may refer to :

Lucius Calpurnius Piso (consul 1 BC)
Lucius Calpurnius Piso (consul 27)
Lucius Calpurnius Piso (consul 57)
Lucius Calpurnius Piso (consul 175)
Lucius Calpurnius Piso Caesoninus (disambiguation)
Lucius Calpurnius Piso Caesoninus (consul 148 BC)
Lucius Calpurnius Piso Caesoninus (consul 112 BC)
Lucius Calpurnius Piso Caesoninus (consul 58 BC)
Lucius Calpurnius Piso Caesoninus (consul 15 BC)
Lucius Calpurnius Piso Frugi (disambiguation)
Lucius Calpurnius Piso Frugi (consul 133 BC)
Lucius Calpurnius Piso Frugi Licinianus

See also

 
 Calpurnius Piso (disambiguation)